Russism may refer to:

 Russianism, a linguistic influence of the Russian language
 Russism (ideology), an ideology propagated by Aleksandr Ivanov-Sukharevsky
 Rashism, or "Russian fascism", a theory that Russia has been transformed into a fascist or neo-fascist country

See also
 Russian fascism (disambiguation)